This is a list of Sheriffs of Derbyshire from 1567 until 1974 and High Sheriffs since.

The ancient Sheriff title originating in the time of the Angles, not long after the invasion of the Kingdom of England, which was in existence for around a thousand years. On 1 April 1974, under the provisions of the Local Government Act 1972, the title of Sheriff of Derbyshire was retitled High Sheriff of Derbyshire. The High Shrievalties are the oldest secular titles under the Crown in England and Wales, their purpose being to represent the monarch at a local level, historically in the shires.

The office was a powerful position in earlier times, as sheriffs were responsible for the maintenance of law and order and various other roles. It was only in 1908 under Edward VII of the United Kingdom that the Lord Lieutenant became more senior than the High Sheriff. Since then the position of High Sheriff has become more ceremonial, with many of its previous responsibilities transferred to High Court judges, magistrates, coroners, local authorities and the police.

From 1068 until 1566, a single High Sheriff of Nottinghamshire, Derbyshire and the Royal Forests was appointed. From Michaelmas 1567 on, a High Sheriff of Derbyshire and Nottinghamshire were appointed separately.

Sheriffs

16th century

17th century

18th century

19th century

20th century

High Sheriffs

20th century

21st century

Notes

References

Bibliography
 
  (with amendments of 1963, Public Record Office)

Derbyshire
Local government in Derbyshire
History of Derbyshire
Derbyshire-related lists